Schmeisser may refer to:

 MP 40, a German World War II submachine gun often called "Schmeisser"
 Louis Schmeisser (1848–1917), German infantry weapons designer, father of Hugo Schmeisser and Hans Schmeisser
 Hugo Schmeisser (1884–1953), German infantry weapons designer
 Hans Schmeisser, German infantry weapons designer
 Schmeisser Award, an NCAA lacrosse award
 Johann Gottlob Schmeisser (1751-1806), Canadian Lutheran minister
 Johann Gottfried Schmeisser (1767–1837), German chemist and naturalist, amongst others Fellow of the Royal Society and member of the Linnean Society of London

Occupational surnames